Tony Johnson is the former Education Director of Shoalwater Bay Indian Tribe, the Chairman of the Chinook Indian Nation (CIN) which has about 3000 people total, and he’s also a Chinuk Wawa language teacher. Johnson was born in South Bend, Washington, and he’s now living in Willapa Bay, Washington with his wife and children. He went to the University of Washington and Central Washington University to study Art and Anthropology. Tony Johnson has been a part of the cultural committee since he was three years old. His father is also a member of the Culture Committee and the Tribal Council. Johnson was named Oregon Indian Educator of the year in 2008.

Recent 
Johnson is now leading a 3000 person tribe. One of his ancestors is Oskalawiliksh, who signed a treaty in 1851. As a descendant of the Chinookan and the chairman of the CIN, he’s trying his best to get the government sign treaties that would let the Chinook community be able to stay in their villages and fish in their rivers. He also fighting to get the Chinook back their lands and their rights which were stripped by the government.

References 

 "Councilman Tony Johnson." Councilman Tony Johnson. Chinook Nation, 2014. Web. 13 Feb. 2017. ULC http://www.chinooknation.org/council/tony_johnson.html
 "Meet Native America: Chairman Tony Johnson, Chinook Indian Nation." The National Museum of the American Indian. N.p., 13 May 2016. Web. 13 Feb. 2017. ULC http://blog.nmai.si.edu/main/2016/05/meet-native-america-tony-johnson.html
 Wilson, Katie. "Chinook Indian Nation Elects New Leader." The Daily Astorian. The Daily Astorian, 24 June 2015. Web. 13 Feb. 2017. ULC http://www.dailyastorian.com/Local_News/20150624/chinook-indian-nation-elects-new-leader

Year of birth missing (living people)
Living people
Native American leaders
People from South Bend, Washington
People from Pacific County, Washington